FC Osipovichi is a Belarusian football club based in Osipovichi, Mogilev Oblast.

History
FC Osipovichi was founded in 1994 as KRZ Osipovichi and started playing in the Belarusian Second League since the 1994–95 season. In 1997, they changed their name to FC Svisloch-Krovlya Osipovichi and won the Second league, receiving promotion to the First League. In 1998, Svisloch-Krovlya finished 2nd in the First League and were promoted to the Premier League. In 1999, Svisloch-Krovlya finished last and were relegated back to the First League, where they were playing from 2000 to 2002. In 2001, the team's name was shortened to FC Svosloch Osipovishi and in 2002 to FC Osipovichi. From 2003 to 2016, they played in the Second League. In 2016, they finished at the 2nd place, which led to promotion to the Belarusian First League. The season 2017 they finished on the 15th place in the First League and were relegated back to the Second League. Since 2018, they play in the Second League.

Name changes
1994: formed as KRZ Osipovichi
1997: renamed to Svisloch-Krovlya Osipovichi
2001: renamed to Svisloch Osipovichi
2002: renamed to Osipovichi

Current squad
As of March 2023

League and Cup history

1 5 points deducted for failure to pay the entrance fee.

References

External links
Profile at footballfacts.ru
Японец будет тренировать «Осиповичи» в третьем дивизионе. Как это вообще произошло?

Association football clubs established in 1994
Football clubs in Belarus
1994 establishments in Belarus